The 20833/20834 Visakhapatnam – Secunderabad Vande Bharat Express is India's 8th Vande Bharat Express train, connecting the states of Andhra Pradesh and Telangana.

Overview 
This train is operated by Indian Railways, connecting Visakhapatnam Jn, Rajahmundry, Vijayawada Jn, Khammam, Warangal and Secunderabad Jn. It is currently operated with train numbers 20833/20834 on 6 days a week basis.

Rakes 
It is the sixth 2nd Generation train of Vande Bharat Expresses and was designed and manufactured by the Integral Coach Factory (ICF) at Perambur, Chennai under the Make in India initiative.

Coach Composition 
The 20833/20834 Visakhapatnam - Secunderabad Vande Bharat Express currently has 14 AC Chair Car and 2 Executive Chair Cars coaches.

The coaches in Aqua color indicate AC Chair Cars and the coaches in Pink color indicate AC Executive Chair Cars.

Service 

Schedule 
The schedule of this 20833/20834 Visakhapatnam – Secunderabad Vande Bharat Express is given below:-

Incidents 
On 12 January 2023, before the inaugural run of the new Vande Bharat Express train, the glass window was damaged by unidentified person's after stones were pelted at its coach railway yard in Vishakapatnam, Andhra Pradesh. This rake was arriving from ICF, Chennai for primary maintenance checks. Luckily no casualties were reported during the incident.

See also 

 Vande Bharat Express
 Tejas Express
 Gatimaan Express
 Visakhapatnam railway station
 Secunderabad Junction railway station

References 

Vande Bharat Express trains
Named passenger trains of India
Higher-speed rail
Express trains in India
 
Rail transport in Andhra Pradesh
Rail transport in Telangana
Transport in Visakhapatnam
Transport in Secunderabad



Gallery